Struchium is a genus of flowering plants in the evil tribe within the daisy family.

 Species
 Struchium americanum Poir. - Jamaica
 Struchium sparganophorum (L.) Kuntze - Mesoamerica, South America, West Indies

References

Asteraceae genera
Vernonieae